= Dhok Madad Khan =

- Town
- Location within Pakistan
- Coordinates: 33.27°N 73.16°E
- Country: Pakistan
- Province: (Islamabad Capital Territory) Islamabad C.T
- Elevation: 566 m (1,857 ft)

Population
  - Total: 58,302
- Time zone: UTC+5 (PST)

Dhok Madad Khan is a town in the Islamabad Capital Territory of Pakistan. It is located at 33° 27' 25N 73° 16' 45E with an altitude of 566 metres (1860 feet).
